David Ruggerio (born Sabatino Antonino Gambino; June 26, 1962, in Brooklyn, USA) is an American chef, author, and television personality. Son of Saverio Erasmo Gambino and Constance Lazzarino, he became famous in the food world during the 1990s.

Biography

His rise to fame began as the chef at the legendary New York eatery, La Caravelle. At the time Ruggerio was only twenty-five years old and garnered rave reviews. He soon found himself a part of the crew of Gambino capo Carmine Lombardozzi, known as the 'King of Wall Street' for his stock pump and dump schemes. Lombardozzi had a rule that all his crew had to take legitimate day jobs to deter suspicion from law enforcement, which led to Ruggerio taking a job in the kitchen at La Caravelle, then one of the top French restaurants in the city.

He went on to take command of Pierre Cardin's New York outpost of Maxim's de Paris where he garnered three stars from the New York Times. He then took his talents to the iconic Park Avenue restaurant, Le Chantilly. Here he gained national acclaim by again receiving three stars from the New York Times and being lauded over in an article by legendary writer Gael Greene entitled "Miracle on 57th Street".

In a 2022 Vanity Fair interview Ruggerio claimed that from an early age, he was forced to follow his Sicilian father into the ways of the street. Taking part in various crimes such as extortion, loan-sharking, truck hijacking, bookmaking, heroin dealing, and murder. In 1979, after his fiancé was murdered by his father’s lieutenant, Ernie Boy Onorato, he became part of New York’s Cosa Nostra’s Gambino Family.
Ruggerio said that in March 1978, he witnessed Sicilian gangster Egidio 'Ernie Boy' Onorato torture and murder a 56-year-old Genovese soldier named Pasquale 'Paddy Mac' Macchirole at a tire repair garage in Yonkers, New York. Ruggerio said Onorato left Macchirole's corpse in a car trunk in Brooklyn. Contemporary reporting confirms that police found Macchirole's body in March 1978. "The body of a reputed organized-crime figure, once accused of extorting money from a prominent Queens nightclub owner who was later murdered, was found stuffed in the trunk of a rented car early yesterday in the Canarsie section of Brooklyn." March 24, 1978 NYT.

Media personality

Ruggerio is a well known cookbook author.  In his first book, he celebrates his family, friends, and the foods of Little Italy. He followed that up with his second cookbook, where Ruggerio draws a distinction between the cooking of Naples and that of Sicily.

He was honored in 1995 by noted vintner Robert Mondavi as a Rising Star Chef, in the first year of this national awards program. He went on to star in his own PBS cooking series entitled, "Little Italy with David Ruggerio." He later went on to star in his own series on Food Network entitled, "Ruggerio to Go."

Ruggerio's first novel, "A Wistful Tale of Gods, Men and Monsters," won the Maxy Award 2019 for Best Horror Novel, and Pencraft Awards - Best Fiction Horror 2019.  He followed up with two more novels and his third cookbook. In the fall of 2022, he will release his long awaited memoir.

Legal history

On November 3, 1998, David Ruggerio was charged with stealing $190,000 from a credit card company by falsifying credit card receipts for payment, in one case by as much as $30,000. He falsified credit card payments by inflating the gratuities left by 26 customers at his restaurant.

On March 12, 1999, he admitted to the charges and paid more than $100,000 in restitution to a credit card company, spent five years on probation and performed 500 hours of community service. Due to this, Food Network debated keeping his show on the air but eventually decided against cancelling it. The network had produced dozens of episodes and spent a small fortune to market it.

Ruggerio subsequently attempted to work in the culinary industry again.

On March 24, 2022, Ruggerio, in a Vanity Fair article, claimed to have been an active member of Gambino crime family from 1977-2014.

Awards

During the 1990s, he was known as one of the best chefs in America. In 1995, vintner Robert Mondavi chose him as one of the 13 best young chefs in America.

Bibliography

Ruggerio, David (2019). David Ruggerio's A Wistful Tale of Gods, Men, and Monsters. Black Rose Writing. .

Featured publications
David Ruggerio has been featured in several national publications:

In October 1995, Ruggerio was featured in a recipe of Food Arts.
In 1996 Ruggerio was hailed as “Everywhere Man” in NY Magazine.
In February 2012, David was featured in a recipe of Food & Wine making Spiced Pear and Rum Risotto.
David was mentioned in the book Eating History: Thirty Turning Points in the Making of American Cuisine by Andrew F. Smith detailing the creation of contemporary American cuisine.

References

External links
 

Living people
American cookbook writers
American people of Italian descent
American restaurateurs
American television chefs
American male chefs
Businesspeople from New York City
Writers from Brooklyn
1962 births